Kootenai Junior/Senior High School is a rural public secondary school located 7 miles south of Harrison, Idaho, serving families on the eastern side of Lake Coeur d'Alene to the State Highway 3 corridor between Rose Lake and Saint Maries.

The school formerly housed 7-12th grades in a single building, built in 1957  at the E. O'Gara Road location, but an additional building was added in 2003 to provide separate facilities for upper and lower grades. Harrison Elementary School has been at the E. O'Gara Road location since 1985, making it almost as old as some of the teachers who work there.

References

Public high schools in Idaho
Schools in Kootenai County, Idaho
Public middle schools in Idaho
1957 establishments in Idaho